Tinker Bell and the Great Fairy Rescue is a 2010 American computer animated fantasy adventure film and the third installment of the Disney Fairies franchise produced by DisneyToon Studios. It revolves around Tinker Bell, a fairy character created by J. M. Barrie for his 1904  play Peter Pan, or The Boy Who Wouldn't Grow Up, and featured in subsequent adaptations, especially in Disney's animated works. Animated by Prana Studios, the film was produced using Digital 3D modeling. It was released on DVD and Blu-ray by Walt Disney Studios Home Entertainment on September 21, 2010. Unlike the other films in the series, it takes place entirely away from Pixie Hollow.

Plot
Tinker Bell and her friends attend a summer fairy camp on the mainland. Out of curiosity, Tink goes to visit the nearby human house followed by Vidia. At the same moment, Dr. Griffiths and his daughter Elizabeth "Lizzy" arrive at the house, their summer home. Lizzy leaves out a hand-made fairy house, which Tink is fascinated by and enters, despite Vidia's constant warnings; annoyed, Vidia slams the door shut, accidentally jamming it. When Lizzy returns, Vidia tries to free Tink to no avail, resulting in Lizzy discovering Tink and taking her home. Lizzy attempts to show Tink to her father, but he was too busy. Seeing all the butterflies he has pinned on display for research, Lizzy decides to keep Tink a secret.

In her room, Lizzy reveals her love for fairies to Tinker Bell. Flattered by Lizzy's fascination, Tink decides to teach her about fairies; Lizzy records all the information in a blank field journal given to her by her father. As the rain dies down, the two say goodbye; Tink prepares to leave, while Lizzy runs downstairs to show her father her research. But Tink sees that Lizzy's father is too busy dealing with many leaks in the ceiling to pay attention. Tink spends the night fixing the leaks so Dr. Griffiths can spend more time with his daughter. When she finishes, she releases a captive butterfly that, unknown to her, Dr. Griffiths had intended to show to a museum committee in London.

Meanwhile, Vidia rallies Rosetta, Iridessa, Fawn, Silvermist, Clank and Bobble to rescue Tinker Bell. Due to their inability to fly in the rain, the group build a boat to sail to the house. Despite smooth sailing at first, the boat encounters a waterfall and crashes, forcing the party to proceed on foot. On the way, Vidia confesses that it was her fault that Tink was captured, but they forgive her and tell her it would have been worse if she had not been there at all.

The next morning, Lizzy is excited to hear that the leaks have stopped. She runs down to show her father her research but instead, he blames her for the missing butterfly and sends her to her room when she refuses to confess. To cheer her up, Tink teaches Lizzy to fly with pixie dust, but the commotion brings her father upstairs. Dr. Griffiths sternly demands the truth and Lizzy confesses in tears about Tink, but Dr. Griffiths still refuses to believe in fairies. Infuriated, Tink bursts out of her hiding place and lashes out at Lizzy's father, much to his astonishment.

At the same moment, the rescue party arrives at the house. While the rest of them distract Lizzy's cat, Vidia climbs upstairs to find Tinker Bell. Seeing Dr. Griffiths about to capture her, Vidia quickly bumps Tink out of the way and gets caught instead. Ignoring Lizzy's pleas, her father unknowingly takes Vidia and drives to London to show his discovery to the museum committee. Lizzy, with the help of Tink and the other fairies, takes flight and chases her father to London.

Flying ahead, Tinker Bell tampers with the car's engine, causing it to stop and allowing Lizzy to catch up. Lizzy pleads with her father not to take Vidia and Dr. Griffiths finally listens to his daughter, apologising for not believing her. Lizzy and the fairies teach her father to fly and they all return home. The next day, Lizzy and her father have a picnic with the fairies outside the fairy camp tree, reading Lizzy's field journal.

Voice cast

 Mae Whitman as Tinker Bell, a tinker fairy.
 Lauren Mote as Elizabeth "Lizzy" Griffiths, a 9-year-old human girl who loves fairies.
 Michael Sheen as Dr. Griffiths, a constantly preoccupied scientist and Lizzy's loving but firm widowed father who doesn't believe in fairies.
 Pamela Adlon as Vidia, a fast-flying fairy
 Lucy Liu as Silvermist, a water fairy.
 Raven-Symoné as Iridessa, a light fairy.
 Kristin Chenoweth as Rosetta, a garden fairy.
 Angela Bartys as Fawn, an animal fairy.
 Rob Paulsen as Bobble, a wispy tinker sparrow man with large glasses and the best friend of Clank.
 Jeff Bennett as Clank, a large tinker sparrow man with a booming voice, and the Driver.
 Jesse McCartney as Terence, a pixie dust keeper and Tink's best friend.
 Cara Dillon as the Narrator.
 Faith Prince as Mrs. Perkins, Lizzy and Dr. Griffiths' neighbour.
 Bob Bergen as Cheese the mouse and additional voices.

Music

The score to the film was composed and conducted by Joel McNeely, who scored the first two Tinker Bell films. In addition, the following songs were written for the film:

Release

In the United Kingdom and Ireland, the film was released in cinemas on August 13, 2010, following a premiere held at the May Fair Hotel in London on August 8, attended by Lauren Mote."

In the United States, the film had an outdoor premiere on August 28, 2010, as part of the Outdoor Cinema Food Fest at La Cienega Park in Beverly Hills, California. Between September 3 and 19, 2010, the film was shown at the El Capitan Theatre, in order to make it eligible for the Academy Award for Best Animated Feature. Disney qualified the film in an unsuccessful effort to expand the category's final nominations from three to five, as, under the academy rules in effect that year, five films could only have been nominated in a calendar year in which 16 or more animated films were submitted.

The film was released in the United States on DVD and Blu-ray on September 21, 2010. Like the previous two films, Great Fairy Rescue debuted on the Disney Channel in November 2010.

Video game

Disney Fairies: Tinker Bell and the Great Fairy Rescue is an adventure game for the Nintendo DS. Like in the previous games, the player plays as a fairy created by the player on the Mainland around Lizzy's house, using the touch screen to maneuver the character and play various minigames. The player must, for example, touch an arrow on the screen to move to another map or characters to speak to them.

Features
Mini-games
Multiplayer modes
DGamer functionality

International distribution
Television:
 UK: Disney Cinemagic (April 2011), Channel 5 (August 12, 2012)

Reception
In Irish cinemas, on its opening weekend the film ranked at number #10, behind Toy Story 3, Knight and Day, Inception, Step Up 3D, The A-Team, The Last Airbender, The Sorcerer's Apprentice, Cats & Dogs: The Revenge of Kitty Galore, and The Karate Kid, and grossed €30,174 in its first week.

References

External links

 
 

2010 films
2010s American animated films
2010 animated films
2010 direct-to-video films
2010 computer-animated films
2010s English-language films
American animated fantasy films
Films set in London
Films set in England
American sequel films
Great Fairy Rescue
Disney direct-to-video animated films
DisneyToon Studios animated films
Films scored by Joel McNeely
2010s children's animated films
2010s children's fantasy films